John F. Kennedy High School (also known as "Kennedy" or "JFK") is a public secondary school located in the Bear Valley neighborhood on the southwest side of Denver, Colorado, United States. The school serves about 1,500 students in grades 9-12 in the Denver Public Schools system.

When the school opened with the spring semester of the 1965 - 1966 school year, it served both grades 7 - 9 and grades 10-12. There was no junior high school in the area, so the new school was designed to accommodate both junior and senior high school students.

In 1974, a court ordered the almost 100% white school, along with the rest of Denver's school system, to begin desegregation busing. A large portion of the former attendance area was assigned to Lincoln High School (without buses) and students from other parts of Denver were assigned to Kennedy (with buses). The court-ordered busing was the start of the great white flight out of the Denver Public School System.

Demographics
Hispanic 77.4%
White 10.3%
African American 2.9%
Asian 7%
Multiple 1.4%
Native American <1% 
80.1% of Kennedy students are eligible for a free/reduced lunch rate.

International Baccalaureate program
On December 11, 2007 Kennedy became the second high school in Denver to offer the two-year International Baccalaureate program, and is the only school in Denver to offer an authorized IB education for all grade levels.

Athletics

Kennedy offers many after-school sports:

 Fall sports
 Football
 Softball
 Golf, boys
 Tennis, boys'
 Volleyball
 Cross country, boys' and girls'
 Boys' soccer
 Girls' gymnastics
 Cheerleading
 Winter sports
 Basketball, boys' and girls'
 Swimming, girls'
 Wrestling, boys'
 Cheerleading
 Spring sports
 Baseball
 Swimming, boys'
 Golf, girls'
 Soccer, girls'
 Tennis, girls'
 Lacrosse, boys' and girls'
 Track and field
 In-line hockey, boys'
 Cheerleading

Teachers honored

The National Association of Biology Teachers, in conjunction with Prentice Hall and the Colorado Biology Teachers Association, gave Kevin Lindauer the Outstanding Biology Teacher Award for Colorado for 2008.

Parent support groups

Commander Connection
The mission of the Commander Connection, also known as the Commander Club, is to act as a support group, to enhance the academic, athletic, social and arts & science activities of the students at John F. Kennedy High School, and to promote school spirit & school pride.  The Commander Connection provides volunteer support of student activities. Meetings are held the first Tuesday of each month at 7:00 p.m. in the Community Room at Kennedy High School.

KIBPA
KIBPA (Kennedy's International Baccalaureate Parent's Association) is the parent support group for IB students and teachers.

Notable alumni

 Greg Jones - former NFL Linebacker
 Tony Laubach - professional storm chaser featured on the Discovery Channel TV series Storm Chasers, National Geographic Channel TV special Into the Tornado, and Women's Entertainment TV series, Twister Sisters
 Gabe Molina - former MLB player (Baltimore Orioles, Atlanta Braves, St. Louis Cardinals)

References

External links
 
 Denver Public Schools

High schools in Denver
Educational institutions established in 1964
International Baccalaureate schools in Colorado
Public high schools in Colorado
1964 establishments in Colorado